Cahaya Hati is an Indonesian television drama series starring Alwi Assegaf, Audrey Junicka Putri, Hamas Syahid, Febby Rastanty, Zikri Daulay, and Yunita Siregar. It produced by MNC Pictures which premiered on 31 July 2017 on RCTI.

Plot 

Nothing less than the lives of Yusuf and Azizah. Both were raised in a loving family. Yusuf (Alwi Assegaf) grows into a handsome, pious, and good silat child while Azizah (Audrey Junicka Putri) grows more beautiful and adorable. Their parents tried to equip them with sufficient religious knowledge because the village where they lived was filled with people who committed immorality. Starting from gambling, cockfighting, and other things that are prohibited by religion.

Happiness stopped for a moment when a flash flood hit their village. Yusuf and Azizah were swept away by the current. Both of their parents who intend to save them turned out to have to go with the flow. Luckily, Yusuf managed to pull Azizah out of the floodwaters. Exhausted, they finally rested in a vehicle that unwittingly took them to Jakarta.

The disaster began. They separated in Jakarta. Azizah, found by Parman (Yadi Timo), a pickpocket. Out of compassion, Azizah is finally invited to live with his wife, Leha (Rita Hamzah). Azizah was renamed by them to Love. Meanwhile, Yusuf is found by Barong (Reza Pahlevi), a thug who sells liquor. Yusuf and Azizah's new life is in stark contrast to the teachings of their parents.

Cast 
Alwi Assegaf as Yusuf/Davi
Audrey Junicka Putri as Azizah/Kasih
Hamas Syahid as Yusuf/Davi
Febby Rastanty as Azizah/Kasih
Zikri Daulay as Galih
Yunita Siregar as Flo
Teddy Syah as Sulaiman
Novi Bunga as Amanda 
Eksanti as Siti/Nur
Yadi Timo as Parman
Rita Hamzah as Leha
Krisna Murti Wibowo as Cahyadi
Rama Michael as Afandi
Mufida Omar Nahdi as Jihan
Lidi Brugman as Vita
Elryan Carlen as Evan
Baron Yusuf Siregar as Toro
Sissy Firman as Fatimeh
Zayyan Sakha as Didit
Marsha Aurelia as Luna
Rafael Putra Ismy as Alif
Rey Bong as Rio
Rayhan Salman as Beno
Rezqi Alfarezi as Jojo
Cinta Adelia as Annisa
Muhammad Riza as Wira
Farell Akbar as Raffa
Herdin Hidayat as Harun
Reza Pahlevi as Barong
Jeanenit Iswara as Della
Eno TB as Aliya
Ferdi Ali as Lutfi
Sheila Alexander as Vira
Teuku Mirza as Ringgo
Ira Ilva Sari as Rani
Krisni Dieta as Aminah
Dwi Yan as Surya
Marissa Christina as Nadia
Gary Iskak as Johan
Ciara Nadine Brosnan as Jihan
Alvino Habibi as Galih
Firdaus Regaldin as Toro
Oding Siregar as Mr. Gan
Revi Atqiya as Ijul
Denny Firdaus as Murad
Lifia Laeticia as Lifia
Emmie Lemu as Emmie

Productions

Casting 
In December 2017, the makers decided to introduce a time-leap in the show and Hamas Syahid, Febby Rastanty and Zikri Daulay was cast to play adult Yusuf, Azizah and Galih.

Filming 
On 3 September 2017 the show completed 50 episodes. The show have a timeslot change from 6.15 pm to 10.15 pm to pave the way for a show Buaya Putih from 11 December 2017.

Reception 
In the first episode, is in third place with TVR 3.6 and audience share 15.3%.

Awards and nominations

References 

Indonesian drama television series
Indonesian television soap operas